Tashkov An is a former resting place for traders and merchants in Kumanovo, Ottoman Empire (later Kingdom of Yugoslavia, today North Macedonia). Tashko was an ethic Vlach who lived on Nagorichki sokak today Ivo Lola Ribar street. The An operated in the late 19th and early 20th century.

References

Macedonian culture
Kumanovo